Frédérick Nicolas (born 19 November 1974) is a French former gymnast. He finished thirty-third in the all around at the 1996 Summer Olympics.

References

External links
 

1974 births
Living people
French male artistic gymnasts
Olympic gymnasts of France
Gymnasts at the 1996 Summer Olympics
Sportspeople from La Tronche